Jens Christian Folkman Schaanning (11 January 1804 – 13 September 1886) was a Norwegian politician.

He worked as a vicar (sogneprest) in Christianssund. He was elected to the Norwegian Parliament in 1848, representing the constituency of Christianssund og Molde (now Kristiansund  in the Nordmøre district of Møre og Romsdal.  He was later re-elected in 1851 and 1859.

References

External links
Christiansund og Molde

1804 births
1886 deaths
Members of the Storting
Møre og Romsdal politicians
Politicians from Kristiansund
Norwegian priest-politicians